"Wishing Well" is a song recorded by Terence Trent D'Arby. "Wishing Well" was certified "Gold", indicating sales of 500,000, by the Recording Industry Association of America in October 1991. Written by D'Arby and Sean Oliver, D'Arby said "Wishing Well" was written "when I was in a half-asleep, half-awake state of mind", and that he "liked the feel of the words". Martyn Ware of Heaven 17 paired with D'Arby in production of the song, which was released on CBS Records. Once released, "Wishing Well", along with D'Arby's debut single "If You Let Me Stay", went into "heavy rotation" on MTV. D'Arby performed the song live at the 30th Annual Grammy Awards, where he lost the Grammy Award for Best New Artist to Jody Watley. When the single reached number one on the Billboard Hot 100, it had charted for 17 weeks, the longest progress to number one in the US charts since Eurythmics' "Sweet Dreams (Are Made of This)" in 1983.

Ben Greenman of The New Yorker credits "Wishing Well", along with other D'Arby songs, with "[bringing] soul music into the eighties". Writing about D'Arby for AllMusic, Stephen Thomas Erlewine called the song "sparse funk", and noted how "Wishing Well" was his first major hit in the United States. Kathi Whalen of The Washington Post credited the song's chart success to D'Arby's combination of "'60s soul and pop on top", and called "Wishing Well" "bouncy".

In popular culture
The song appears in Grand Theft Auto: Episodes from Liberty City fictional radio station Vice City FM.

Track listings
 7" single
 "Wishing Well" (3:33)
 "Elevators & Hearts" (4:41)

 12" maxi
 "Wishing Well" (Three Coins In A Fountain Mix) (6:14)
 "Elevators & Hearts" (4:41)
 "Wishing Well" (The Cool in the Shade mix) (7:50)
 "Wonderful World" (3:56)

 12" maxi
 "Wishing Well" (The Cool in the Shade mix) (7:50)
 "Wonderful World" (3:56)
 "Elevators & Hearts" (4:04)

 Cassette
 "Wishing Well" (3:33)
 "Elevators & Hearts" (4:04)

Charts and sales

Weekly charts

Year-end charts

Certifications and sales

References

1987 singles
Billboard Hot 100 number-one singles
Cashbox number-one singles
Dutch Top 40 number-one singles
Terence Trent D'Arby songs
RPM Top Singles number-one singles
Songs written by Terence Trent D'Arby
Songs written by Sean Oliver
1987 songs
CBS Records singles
Music videos directed by Vaughan Arnell